Bring Me the Head of Tim Horton is a Canadian short documentary film, directed by Guy Maddin, Evan Johnson and Galen Johnson, and released in 2015. Documenting the making of Paul Gross's contemporaneous feature film Hyena Road, the film also functions as a critique of the commercial excesses and glorified violence of mainstream filmmaking.

The film premiered at the 2015 Toronto International Film Festival, and was named to TIFF's annual year-end Canada's Top Ten list for 2015.

References

External links
 

2015 films
Canadian short documentary films
Films directed by Guy Maddin
2010s English-language films
2010s Canadian films
2015 short documentary films